The 2021 Play In Challenger was a professional tennis tournament played on indoor hard courts. It was the third edition of the tournament which was part of the 2021 ATP Challenger Tour. It took place in Lille, France, between 22 and 28 March 2021.

Singles main-draw entrants

Seeds

 1 Rankings are as of 15 March 2021.

Other entrants
The following players received wildcards into the singles main draw:
  Arthur Cazaux
  Evan Furness
  Lilian Marmousez

The following player received entry into the singles main draw using a protected ranking:
  Dustin Brown

The following player received entry into the singles main draw as an alternate:
  Maxime Hamou

The following players received entry from the qualifying draw:
  Zizou Bergs
  Jurgen Briand
  Baptiste Crepatte
  Matteo Martineau

The following player received entry as a lucky loser:
  Filip Cristian Jianu

Champions

Singles

   Zizou Bergs def.  Grégoire Barrère 4–6, 6–1, 7–6(7–5).

Doubles

  Benjamin Bonzi /  Antoine Hoang def.  Dan Added /  Michael Geerts 6–3, 6–1.

References

External links
Official Website

2021 ATP Challenger Tour
2021 in French tennis
March 2021 sports events in France